Stihi is a fire-breathing storm demon in Albanian mythology and folklore, similar to the kulshedra.

Etymology

Appearance
A female demon in south Albanian and Italo-Albanian popular belief. Sometimes depicted as a fearsome fire-breathing dragon guarding a treasure.

See also
 Kulshedra
 Kukuth
 Perria

Sources

Citations

Bibliography

Albanian legendary creatures
Albanian folklore
Demons